Aristides Karvelas (born 20 March 1994) is a South African cricketer. He made his List A debut for Gauteng in the 2018–19 CSA Provincial One-Day Challenge on 28 October 2018. He made his first-class debut for Gauteng in the 2018–19 CSA 3-Day Provincial Cup on 8 November 2018.

In June 2022, he was named in Greece's Twenty20 International (T20I) squad for the Qualifier A tournament in Finland that formed part of the 2022–23 ICC Men's T20 World Cup Europe Qualifier. He made his T20I debut on 12 July 2022, for Greece against Italy. Later the same month, he was named in Sussex's squad that played in the 2022 County Championship match against Middlesex in England.

References

External links
 

1994 births
Living people
South African cricketers
Gauteng cricketers
Greek cricketers
Greece Twenty20 International cricketers
People from Alberton, Gauteng
Sussex cricketers